The Waimea River is located in the north of the South Island of New Zealand. It is formed from the confluence of the Wairoa River and the Wai-iti River, which meet near Brightwater. The combined waters flow into Tasman Bay / Te Tai-o-Aorere near Appleby, opposite Rabbit Island.

References

Rivers of the Tasman District
Rivers of New Zealand